The term Kingship of Tara was a title of authority in ancient Ireland - the title is closely associated with the archaeological complex at the Hill of Tara. The position was considered to be of eminent authority in medieval Irish literature and Irish mythology, although national kingship was never a historical reality in early Ireland. The term also represented a prehistoric and mythical ideal of sacred kingship in Ireland. Holding the title King of Tara invested the incumbent with a powerful status. Many Irish High Kings were simultaneously Kings of Tara. The title emerged in the ninth and tenth centuries. In later times, actual claimants to this title used their position to promote themselves in status and fact to the High Kingship. Prior to this, various branches of the Uí Néill dynasty appear to have used it to denote overlordship of their kindred and realms. It was associated with Feis Temro (Feast of Tara), a pagan inauguration rite.

The titles King of Tara and High King of Ireland were distinct and unrelated for much of history.

The following is a list of those accorded the title (or at least believed to be seated) in the Irish annals—the kings and legends. The dates and names of the early kings are uncertain and are often highly suspect. Several may be doubles of others, while composite characters may be entirely fictitious. Some may also be assigned to the wrong prehistoric kindred.

Legendary Kings of Tara

Prehistoric

Mythological:
Eochu Feidlech
Eochu Airem
Lugaid Riab nDerg
Crimthann Nia Náir
Feradach Finnfechtnach
Érainn and Dáirine (Corcu Loígde):
Eterscél Mór
Conaire Mór / Conaire Cóem
Dáire Doimthech
Mac Con / Lugaid Loígde
Eochaid Étgudach
Laigin:
Úgaine Mór
Lóegaire Lorc
Cobthach Cóel Breg
Labraid Loingsech
Cairbre Nia Fer
Nuadu Necht
Cathair Mór
Dál Cuinn (Connachta and Uí Néill):
(Fíachu Finnolach) 
Tuathal Techtmar
Fedlimid Rechtmar
Conn of the Hundred Battles
Art mac Cuinn
Cormac mac Airt
Cairbre Lifechair

Late Prehistoric

Niall of the Nine Hostages
Lóegaire mac Néill
Coirpre mac Néill
Ailill Molt

Early Historic Kings of Tara

Mac Cairthinn mac Coelboth, died 546/547
Tuathal Maelgarb, d.544/549
Diarmait mac Cerbaill, before 558 – 565
Forggus mac Muirchertaig and Domnall mac Muirchertaig, 565–569?
Báetán mac Muirchertaig and Eochaid mac Domnaill, 569? – 572/573
Ainmuire mac Sétnai, 572/573 – 575/576
Áed mac Ainmuirech, 575/576, or 592 – 598
Fiachnae mac Báetáin (Fiachnae Lurgan), 589–626
Colmán Rímid mac Báetáin and Áed Sláine mac Diarmato, 598–604
Áed Allán mac Domnaill (Áed Uaridnach), "king of Temair", 604–?
Congal Cáech, died 637

Later Kings of Tara

Cathal mac Finguine, 713–742
Áed Allán, 730–738
Donnchad Midi mac Murchado, 763–797
Áed Oirdnide mac Néill, 797–819 
Conchobar mac Donnchada, 819–833
Niall Caille mac Áeda, 833–846
Máel Sechnaill mac Máele Ruanaid, 846–862
Áed Findliath mac Néill, 862–879
Flann Sinna mac Máelschnaill, 878–916
Niall Glúndub, 916–919
Donnchad Donn mac Flainn, 919–944
Ruaidrí Ua Canannáin, 944 – 30 November 950
Congalach Cnogba mac Máelmithig, 950–956
Domnall ua Néill, 956–980
Máel Sechnaill mac Domnaill, 980–1002

Baile Chuinn Chétchathaig

Togail Bruidne Dá Derga

See also
 Irish kings
 High King of Ireland
 List of High Kings of Ireland
 Cín Dromma Snechtai

Notes

References

Edel Bhreathnach and Kevin Murray, "Baile Chuinn Chétchathaig: Edition", in Edel Bhreathnach (ed.), The Kingship and Landscape of Tara. Dublin: Four Courts Press for The Discovery Programme. 2005. pp. 73–94
Edel Bhreathnach (ed.), The Kingship and Landscape of Tara. Dublin: Four Courts Press for The Discovery Programme. 2005.
Francis John Byrne, Irish Kings and High-Kings. Four Courts Press. 2nd revised edition, 2001.
Thomas Charles-Edwards, Early Christian Ireland. Cambridge University Press. 2000.
Anne Connon, "A Prosopography of the Early Queens of Tara", in Edel Bhreathnach (ed.), The Kingship and Landscape of Tara. Dublin: Four Courts Press for The Discovery Programme. 2005. pp. 225–327
Lucius Gwynn, "De Síl Chonairi Móir", in Ériu 6 (1912): 130–43.
Bart Jaski, Early Irish Kingship and Succession. Four Courts Press. 2000.
Bart Jaski "The Vikings and the Kingship of Tara", in Perita, 311–351, vol. 9, 1995.
Ailbhe Mac Shamhráin and Paul Byrne, "Prosopography I: Kings named in Baile Chuinn Chétchathaig and the Airgíalla Charter Poem", in Edel Bhreathnach (ed.), The Kingship and Landscape of Tara. Dublin: Four Courts Press for The Discovery Programme. 2005. pp. 159–224
Gerard Murphy, "On the Dates of Two Sources Used in Thurneysen's Heldensage: I. Baile Chuind and the date of Cín Dromma Snechtai", in Ériu 16 (1952): 145–51. includes edition and translation.
T. F. O'Rahilly, Early Irish History and Mythology. Dublin Institute for Advanced Studies. 1946.

Annals

 The Annals of Ulster - http://www.ucc.ie/celt/published/T100001A/index.html
 The Annals of Inisfallen - http://www.ucc.ie/celt/published/T100004/index.html
 Chronicon Scotorum -  http://www.ucc.ie/celt/published/T100016/index.html
 The Fragmentary Annals of Ireland - http://www.ucc.ie/celt/published/T100017/index.html
 Annals of the Four Masters - http://www.ucc.ie/celt/published/T100005A/index.html

External links
 Map of Tara

Medieval Ireland
Lists of Irish monarchs